Out of My Way is a 1997 solo album by Peter Holsapple, on the New Orleans label Monkey Hill records. Personnel includes keyboardist Benmont Tench and Holsapple's fellow Continental Drifters Vicki Peterson, Susan Cowsill and Carlo Nuccio.

Critical reception
AllMusic's editors gave the album four out of five stars, praising wordplay in the lyrics and the bass guitar instrumentation.

Track listing
"I Been There" – 3:47
"No Sound" – 4:02
"Away with Love" – 3:47
"Pretty, Damned, Smart" – 3:34
"Couldn't Stop Lying to You" – 4:28
"Out of My Way" – 3:09
"Shirley" – 3:48
"Meet Me in the Middle" – 3:44
"I Am a Tree" – 2:37
"Don't Worry About John" – 2:15
"Here and Now" – 4:10

Personnel
Peter Holsapple
Musicians: Benmont Tench, Carlo Nuccio, Ilene Markell, Rob Savoy, Robert Johnston, Susan Cowsill, Vicki Peterson

References

Peter Holsapple albums
1997 debut albums